Alex Jensen (born May 16, 1976) is an American former professional basketball player, and current assistant coach for the Utah Jazz of the National Basketball Association (NBA). He was a standout college player at the University of Utah.

College career
Jensen, Utah's 1994 Mr. Basketball from Centerville, played for coach Rick Majerus at Utah.  As a freshman, he averaged 24.8 minutes, 6.7 points and 6.1 rebounds per game.  Following his first season, Jensen left to complete a two-year Latter-day Saint mission in England.

Upon returning from his mission, Jensen entered the starting lineup for the 1997–98 season.  Jensen and teammates Andre Miller, Michael Doleac, and Hanno Möttölä, led the Utes to one of the best seasons in school history, as the Utes went 30–4 and played for the 1998 National Championship, losing to Kentucky.  Jensen averaged 6.8 points and 5.2 rebounds and was named to the All-West Regional team for the NCAA tournament.

As a junior, Jensen took another step in his development as he made the All-Western Athletic Conference team (Pacific Division) and the WAC All-Defensive team after averaging 12.1 points and 7.6 rebounds per game.  He was also the 1999 WAC men's basketball tournament MVP as he led the Utes back to the NCAA tournament.  As a senior, Jensen was the first Mountain West Conference player of the year as the Utes became a charter member of the league.  Jensen averaged 13.1 points and 7.5 rebounds per game that season and scored 1,279 points and collected 896 rebounds for his college career.

Professional career
Following the close of his college career, Jensen began an international career that would bring him to Spain, Japan and Turkey.  While he was in Turkey, he was named All-FIBA Europe Cup Defender of the Year in 2004.  He also played a season in the Continental Basketball Association for the Yakama Sun Kings, winning a league championship and earning All-Defensive Team honors in 2003.

Coaching career
In 2007, Jensen left professional basketball to become an assistant coach for his mentor, Rick Majerus, as a member of his new staff at Saint Louis.  Jensen remained on Majerus' staff for four seasons, until he was offered the job as the first head coach of the Canton Charge of the NBA Development League. Jensen was named the NBA D-League's Coach of the Year for 2013 in just his second season. On July 23, 2013, Jensen was added to the Utah Jazz coaching staff to work as a player development assistant. Two years later, on June 26, 2015, he joined Chris Fleming's staff as an assistant for the Germany national team. In August 2022, Jensen led the United States as head coach for the 2022 FIBA AmeriCup.

References

1976 births
Living people
20th-century Mormon missionaries
American expatriate basketball people in Germany
American expatriate basketball people in Japan
American expatriate basketball people in Spain
American expatriate basketball people in Turkey
American men's basketball coaches
American men's basketball players
American Mormon missionaries in England
Basketball coaches from Utah
Basketball players from Utah
Canton Charge coaches
CB Girona players
Darüşşafaka Basketbol players
Latter Day Saints from Utah
Liga ACB players
Nagoya Diamond Dolphins players
People from Centerville, Utah
Saint Louis Billikens men's basketball coaches
Small forwards
TED Ankara Kolejliler players
Tuborg Pilsener basketball players
Türk Telekom B.K. players
Utah Jazz assistant coaches
Utah Utes men's basketball players
Yakima Sun Kings players